A lobotomy, or leucotomy, is a form of neurosurgical treatment for psychiatric disorder or neurological disorder (e.g. epilepsy) that involves severing connections in the brain's prefrontal cortex. The surgery causes most of the connections to and from the prefrontal cortex, the anterior part of the frontal lobes of the brain, to be severed.

In the past, this treatment was used for treating psychiatric disorders as a mainstream procedure in some countries. The procedure was controversial from its initial use, in part due to a lack of recognition of the severity and chronicity of severe and enduring psychiatric illnesses, so it was said to be an inappropriate treatment.

The originator of the procedure, Portuguese neurologist António Egas Moniz, shared the Nobel Prize for Physiology or Medicine of 1949 for the "discovery of the therapeutic value of leucotomy in certain psychoses", although the awarding of the prize has been subject to controversy.

The use of the procedure increased dramatically from the early 1940s and into the 1950s; by 1951, almost 20,000 lobotomies had been performed in the United States and proportionally more in the United Kingdom. More lobotomies were performed on women than on men: a 1951 study found that nearly 60% of American lobotomy patients were women, and limited data shows that 74% of lobotomies in Ontario from 1948 to 1952 were performed on female patients. From the 1950s onward, lobotomy began to be abandoned, first in the Soviet Union and Europe.

Effects

Historically, patients of lobotomy were, immediately following surgery, often stuporous, confused, and incontinent. Some developed an enormous appetite and gained considerable weight. Seizures were another common complication of surgery. Emphasis was put on the training of patients in the weeks and months following surgery.

The purpose of the operation was to reduce the symptoms of mental disorders, and it was recognized that this was accomplished at the expense of a person's personality and intellect. British psychiatrist Maurice Partridge, who conducted a follow-up study of 300 patients, said that the treatment achieved its effects by "reducing the complexity of psychic life". Following the operation, spontaneity, responsiveness, self-awareness, and self-control were reduced. The activity was replaced by inertia, and people were mostly left emotionally blunted and restricted in their intellectual range.

The consequences of the operation have been described as "mixed". Some patients died as a result of the operation and others later committed suicide. Some were left severely brain damaged. Others were able to leave the hospital, or became more manageable within the hospital. A few people managed to return to responsible work, while at the other extreme, people were left with severe and disabling impairments. Most people fell into an intermediate group, left with some improvement of their symptoms but also with emotional and intellectual deficits to which they made a better or worse adjustment. On average, there was a mortality rate of approximately 5% during the 1940s.

The lobotomy procedure could have severe negative effects on a patient's personality and ability to function independently. Lobotomy patients often show a marked reduction in initiative and inhibition. They may also exhibit difficulty imagining themselves in the position of others because of decreased cognition and detachment from society.

Walter Freeman coined the term "surgically induced childhood" and used it constantly to refer to the results of lobotomy. The operation left people with an "infantile personality"; a period of maturation would then, according to Freeman, lead to recovery. In an unpublished memoir, he described how the "personality of the patient was changed in some way in the hope of rendering him more amenable to the social pressures under which he is supposed to exist." He described one 29-year-old woman as being, following lobotomy, a "smiling, lazy and satisfactory patient with the personality of an oyster" who could not remember Freeman's name and endlessly poured coffee from an empty pot. When her parents had difficulty dealing with her behaviour, Freeman advised a system of rewards (ice-cream) and punishment (smacks).

History

In the early 20th century, the number of patients residing in mental hospitals increased significantly while little in the way of effective medical treatment was available. Lobotomy was one of a series of radical and invasive physical therapies developed in Europe at this time that signaled a break with a psychiatric culture of therapeutic nihilism that had prevailed since the late nineteenth-century. The new "heroic" physical therapies devised during this experimental era, including malarial therapy for general paresis of the insane (1917), deep sleep therapy (1920), insulin shock therapy (1933), cardiazol shock therapy (1934), and electroconvulsive therapy (1938), helped to imbue the then therapeutically moribund and demoralised psychiatric profession with a renewed sense of optimism in the curability of insanity and the potency of their craft. The success of the shock therapies, despite the considerable risk they posed to patients, also helped to accommodate psychiatrists to ever more drastic forms of medical intervention, including lobotomy.

The clinician-historian Joel Braslow argues that from malarial therapy onward to lobotomy, physical psychiatric therapies "spiral closer and closer to the interior of the brain" with this organ increasingly taking "center stage as a source of disease and site of cure". For Roy Porter, once the doyen of medical history, the often violent and invasive psychiatric interventions developed during the 1930s and 1940s are indicative of both the well-intentioned desire of psychiatrists to find some medical means of alleviating the suffering of the vast number of patients then in psychiatric hospitals and also the relative lack of social power of those same patients to resist the increasingly radical and even reckless interventions of asylum doctors. Many doctors, patients and family members of the period believed that despite potentially catastrophic consequences, the results of lobotomy were seemingly positive in many instances or, were at least deemed as such when measured next to the apparent alternative of long-term institutionalisation. Lobotomy has always been controversial, but for a period of the medical mainstream, it was even feted and regarded as a legitimate last resort remedy for categories of patients who were otherwise regarded as hopeless. Today, lobotomy has become a disparaged procedure, a byword for medical barbarism and an exemplary instance of the medical trampling of patients' rights.

Early psychosurgery

Before the 1930s, individual doctors had infrequently experimented with novel surgical operations on the brains of those deemed insane. Most notably in 1888, the Swiss psychiatrist Gottlieb Burckhardt initiated what is commonly considered the first systematic attempt at modern human psychosurgery. He operated on six chronic patients under his care at the Swiss Préfargier Asylum, removing sections of their cerebral cortex. Burckhardt's decision to operate was informed by three pervasive views on the nature of mental illness and its relationship to the brain. First, the belief that mental illness was organic in nature, and reflected an underlying brain pathology; next, that the nervous system was organized according to an associationist model comprising an input or afferent system (a sensory center), a connecting system where information processing took place (an association center), and an output or efferent system (a motor center); and, finally, a modular conception of the brain whereby discrete mental faculties were connected to specific regions of the brain. Burckhardt's hypothesis was that by deliberately creating lesions in regions of the brain identified as association centers a transformation in behaviour might ensue. According to his model, those mentally ill might experience "excitations abnormal in quality, quantity and intensity" in the sensory regions of the brain and this abnormal stimulation would then be transmitted to the motor regions giving rise to mental pathology. He reasoned, however, that removing material from either of the sensory or motor zones could give rise to "grave functional disturbance". Instead, by targeting the association centers and creating a "ditch" around the motor region of the temporal lobe, he hoped to break their lines of communication and thus alleviate both mental symptoms and the experience of mental distress.

Intending to ameliorate symptoms in those with violent and intractable conditions rather than effect a cure, Burckhardt began operating on patients in December 1888, but both his surgical methods and instruments were crude and the results of the procedure were mixed at best. He operated on six patients in total and, according to his own assessment, two experienced no change, two patients became quieter, one patient experienced epileptic convulsions and died a few days after the operation, and one patient improved. Complications included motor weakness, epilepsy, sensory aphasia and "word deafness". Claiming a success rate of 50 percent, he presented the results at the Berlin Medical Congress and published a report, but the response from his medical peers was hostile and he did no further operations.

In 1912, two physicians based in Saint Petersburg, the leading Russian neurologist Vladimir Bekhterev and his younger Estonian colleague, the neurosurgeon Ludvig Puusepp, published a paper reviewing a range of surgical interventions that had been performed on the mentally ill. While generally treating these endeavours favorably, in their consideration of psychosurgery they reserved unremitting scorn for Burckhardt's surgical experiments of 1888 and opined that it was extraordinary that a trained medical doctor could undertake such an unsound procedure.

The authors neglected to mention, however, that in 1910 Puusepp himself had performed surgery on the brains of three mentally ill patients, sectioning the cortex between the frontal and parietal lobes. He had abandoned these attempts because of unsatisfactory results and this experience probably inspired the invective that was directed at Burckhardt in the 1912 article. By 1937, Puusepp, despite his earlier criticism of Burckhardt, was increasingly persuaded that psychosurgery could be a valid medical intervention for the mentally disturbed. In the late 1930s, he worked closely with the neurosurgical team of the Racconigi Hospital near Turin to establish it as an early and influential centre for the adoption of leucotomy in Italy.

Development

Leucotomy was first undertaken in 1935 under the direction of the Portuguese neurologist (and inventor of the term psychosurgery) António Egas Moniz. First developing an interest in psychiatric conditions and their somatic treatment in the early 1930s, Moniz apparently conceived a new opportunity for recognition in the development of a surgical intervention on the brain as a treatment for mental illness.

Frontal lobes
The source of inspiration for Moniz's decision to hazard psychosurgery has been clouded by contradictory statements made on the subject by Moniz and others both contemporaneously and retrospectively. The traditional narrative addresses the question of why Moniz targeted the frontal lobes by way of reference to the work of the Yale neuroscientist John Fulton and, most dramatically, to a presentation Fulton made with his junior colleague Carlyle Jacobsen at the Second International Congress of Neurology held in London in 1935. Fulton's primary area of research was on the cortical function of primates and he had established America's first primate neurophysiology laboratory at Yale in the early 1930s. At the 1935 Congress, with Moniz in attendance, Fulton and Jacobsen presented two chimpanzees, named Becky and Lucy who had had frontal lobectomies and subsequent changes in behaviour and intellectual function. According to Fulton's account of the congress, they explained that before surgery, both animals, and especially Becky, the more emotional of the two, exhibited "frustrational behaviour"that is, have tantrums that could include rolling on the floor and defecatingif, because of their poor performance in a set of experimental tasks, they were not rewarded. Following the surgical removal of their frontal lobes, the behaviour of both primates changed markedly and Becky was pacified to such a degree that Jacobsen apparently stated it was as if she had joined a "happiness cult". During the question and answer section of the paper, Moniz, it is alleged, "startled" Fulton by inquiring if this procedure might be extended to human subjects suffering from mental illness. Fulton stated that he replied that while possible in theory it was surely "too formidable" an intervention for use on humans.

Moniz began his experiments with leucotomy just three months after the congress had reinforced the apparent cause and effect relationship between the Fulton and Jacobsen presentation and the Portuguese neurologist's resolve to operate on the frontal lobes. As the author of this account Fulton, who has sometimes been claimed as the father of lobotomy, was later able to record that the technique had its true origination in his laboratory. Endorsing this version of events, in 1949, the Harvard neurologist Stanley Cobb remarked during his presidential address to the American Neurological Association that "seldom in the history of medicine has a laboratory observation been so quickly and dramatically translated into a therapeutic procedure". Fulton's report, penned ten years after the events described, is, however, without corroboration in the historical record and bears little resemblance to an earlier unpublished account he wrote of the congress. In this previous narrative he mentioned an incidental, private exchange with Moniz, but it is likely that the official version of their public conversation he promulgated is without foundation. In fact, Moniz stated that he had conceived of the operation some time before his journey to London in 1935, having told in confidence his junior colleague, the young neurosurgeon Pedro Almeida Lima, as early as 1933 of his psychosurgical idea. The traditional account exaggerates the importance of Fulton and Jacobsen to Moniz's decision to initiate frontal lobe surgery, and omits the fact that a detailed body of neurological research that emerged at this time suggested to Moniz and other neurologists and neurosurgeons that surgery on this part of the brain might yield significant personality changes in the mentally ill.

The frontal lobes had been the object of scientific inquiry and speculation since the late 19th century. Fulton's contribution, while it may have functioned as source of intellectual support, is of itself unnecessary and inadequate as an explanation of Moniz's resolution to operate on this section of the brain. Under an evolutionary and hierarchical model of brain development it had been hypothesized that those regions associated with more recent development, such as the mammalian brain and, most especially, the frontal lobes, were responsible for more complex cognitive functions. However, this theoretical formulation found little laboratory support, as 19th-century experimentation found no significant change in animal behaviour following surgical removal or electrical stimulation of the frontal lobes. This picture of the so-called "silent lobe" changed in the period after World War I with the production of clinical reports of ex-servicemen with brain trauma. The refinement of neurosurgical techniques also facilitated increasing attempts to remove brain tumours, treat focal epilepsy in humans and led to more precise experimental neurosurgery in animal studies. Cases were reported where mental symptoms were alleviated following the surgical removal of diseased or damaged brain tissue. The accumulation of medical case studies on behavioural changes following damage to the frontal lobes led to the formulation of the concept of Witzelsucht, which designated a neurological condition characterised by a certain hilarity and childishness in those with the condition. The picture of frontal lobe function that emerged from these studies was complicated by the observation that neurological deficits attendant on damage to a single lobe might be compensated for if the opposite lobe remained intact. In 1922, the Italian neurologist Leonardo Bianchi published a detailed report on the results of bilateral lobectomies in animals that supported the contention that the frontal lobes were both integral to intellectual function and that their removal led to the disintegration of the subject's personality. This work, while influential, was not without its critics due to deficiencies in experimental design.

The first bilateral lobectomy of a human subject was performed by the American neurosurgeon Walter Dandy in 1930. The neurologist Richard Brickner reported on this case in 1932, relating that the recipient, known as "Patient A", while experiencing a blunting of affect, had no apparent decrease in intellectual function and seemed, at least to the casual observer, perfectly normal. Brickner concluded from this evidence that "the frontal lobes are not 'centers' for the intellect". These clinical results were replicated in a similar operation undertaken in 1934 by the neurosurgeon Roy Glenwood Spurling and reported on by the neuropsychiatrist Spafford Ackerly. By the mid-1930s, interest in the function of the frontal lobes reached a high-water mark. This was reflected in the 1935 neurological congress in London, which hosted as part of its deliberations, "a remarkable symposium ... on the functions of the frontal lobes". The panel was chaired by Henri Claude, a French neuropsychiatrist, who commenced the session by reviewing the state of research on the frontal lobes, and concluded that "altering the frontal lobes profoundly modifies the personality of subjects". This parallel symposium contained numerous papers by neurologists, neurosurgeons and psychologists; amongst these was one by Brickner, which impressed Moniz greatly, that again detailed the case of "Patient A". Fulton and Jacobsen's paper, presented in another session of the conference on experimental physiology, was notable in linking animal and human studies on the function of the frontal lobes. Thus, at the time of the 1935 Congress, Moniz had available to him an increasing body of research on the role of the frontal lobes that extended well beyond the observations of Fulton and Jacobsen.

Nor was Moniz the only medical practitioner in the 1930s to have contemplated procedures directly targeting the frontal lobes. Although ultimately discounting brain surgery as carrying too much risk, physicians and neurologists such as William Mayo, Thierry de Martel, Richard Brickner, and Leo Davidoff had, before 1935, entertained the proposition. Inspired by Julius Wagner-Jauregg's development of malarial therapy for the treatment of general paresis of the insane, the French physician Maurice Ducosté reported in 1932 that he had injected 5 ml of malarial blood directly into the frontal lobes of over 100 paretic patients through holes drilled into the skull. He claimed that the injected paretics showed signs of "uncontestable mental and physical amelioration" and that the results for psychotic patients undergoing the procedure was also "encouraging". The experimental injection of fever-inducing malarial blood into the frontal lobes was also replicated during the 1930s in the work of Ettore Mariotti and M. Sciutti in Italy and Ferdière Coulloudon in France. In Switzerland, almost simultaneously with the commencement of Moniz's leucotomy programme, the neurosurgeon François Ody had removed the entire right frontal lobe of a catatonic schizophrenic patient. In Romania, Ody's procedure was adopted by Dimitri Bagdasar and Constantinesco working out of the Central Hospital in Bucharest. Ody, who delayed publishing his own results for several years, later rebuked Moniz for claiming to have cured patients through leucotomy without waiting to determine if there had been a "lasting remission".

Neurological model

The theoretical underpinnings of Moniz's psychosurgery were largely commensurate with the nineteenth-century ones that had informed Burckhardt's decision to excise matter from the brains of his patients. Although in his later writings Moniz referenced both the neuron theory of Ramón y Cajal and the conditioned reflex of Ivan Pavlov, in essence he simply interpreted this new neurological research in terms of the old psychological theory of associationism. He differed significantly from Burckhardt, however in that he did not think there was any organic pathology in the brains of the mentally ill, but rather that their neural pathways were caught in fixed and destructive circuits leading to "predominant, obsessive ideas". As Moniz wrote in 1936:
[The] mental troubles must have ... a relation with the formation of cellulo-connective groupings, which become more or less fixed. The cellular bodies may remain altogether normal, their cylinders will not have any anatomical alterations; but their multiple liaisons, very variable in normal people, may have arrangements more or less fixed, which will have a relation with persistent ideas and deliria in certain morbid psychic states.

For Moniz, "to cure these patients", it was necessary to "destroy the more or less fixed arrangements of cellular connections that exist in the brain, and particularly those which are related to the frontal lobes", thus removing their fixed pathological brain circuits. Moniz believed the brain would functionally adapt to such injury. Unlike the position adopted by Burckhardt, it was unfalsifiable according to the knowledge and technology of the time as the absence of a known correlation between physical brain pathology and mental illness could not disprove his thesis.

First leucotomies

On 12 November 1935 at the Hospital Santa Marta in Lisbon, Moniz initiated the first of a series of operations on the brains of people with mental illnesses. The initial patients selected for the operation were provided by the medical director of Lisbon's Miguel Bombarda Mental Hospital, José de Matos Sobral Cid. As Moniz lacked training in neurosurgery and his hands were impaired by gout, the procedure was performed under general anaesthetic by Pedro Almeida Lima, who had previously assisted Moniz with his research on cerebral angiography. The intention was to remove some of the long fibres that connected the frontal lobes to other major brain centres. To this end, it was decided that Lima would trephine into the side of the skull and then inject ethanol into the "subcortical white matter of the prefrontal area" so as to destroy the connecting fibres, or association tracts, and create what Moniz termed a "frontal barrier". After the first operation was complete, Moniz considered it a success and, observing that the patient's depression had been relieved, he declared her "cured" although she was never, in fact, discharged from the mental hospital. Moniz and Lima persisted with this method of injecting alcohol into the frontal lobes for the next seven patients but, after having to inject some patients on numerous occasions to elicit what they considered a favourable result, they modified the means by which they would section the frontal lobes. It had a retractable wire loop at one end that, when rotated, produced a  diameter circular lesion in the white matter of the frontal lobe. Typically, six lesions were cut into each lobe, but, if they were dissatisfied by the results, Lima might perform several procedures, each producing multiple lesions in the left and right frontal lobes.

By the conclusion of this first run of leucotomies in February 1936, Moniz and Lima had operated on twenty patients with an average period of one week between each procedure; Moniz published his findings with great haste in March of the same year. The patients were aged between 27 and 62 years of age; twelve were female and eight were male. Nine of the patients were diagnosed with depression, six with schizophrenia, two with panic disorder, and one each with mania, catatonia and manic-depression. Their most prominent symptoms were anxiety and agitation. The duration of their illness before the procedure varied from as little as four weeks to as much as 22 years, although all but four had been ill for at least one year. Patients were normally operated on the day they arrived at Moniz's clinic and returned within ten days to the Miguel Bombarda Mental Hospital. A perfunctory post-operative follow-up assessment took place anywhere from one to ten weeks following surgery. Complications were observed in each of the leucotomy patients and included: "increased temperature, vomiting, bladder and bowel incontinence, diarrhea, and ocular affections such as ptosis and nystagmus, as well as psychological effects such as apathy, akinesia, lethargy, timing and local disorientation, kleptomania, and abnormal sensations of hunger". Moniz asserted that these effects were transitory and, according to his published assessment, the outcome for these first twenty patients was that 35%, or seven cases, improved significantly, another 35% were somewhat improved and the remaining 30% (six cases) were unchanged. There were no deaths and he did not consider that any patients had deteriorated following leucotomy.

Reception

Moniz rapidly disseminated his results through articles in the medical press and a monograph in 1936. Initially, however, the medical community appeared hostile to the new procedure. On 26 July 1936, one of his assistants, Diogo Furtado, gave a presentation at the Parisian meeting of the Société Médico-Psychologique on the results of the second cohort of patients leucotomised by Lima. Sobral Cid, who had supplied Moniz with the first set of patients for leucotomy from his own hospital in Lisbon, attended the meeting and denounced the technique, declaring that the patients who had been returned to his care post-operatively were "diminished" and had experienced a "degradation of personality". He also claimed that the changes Moniz observed in patients were more properly attributed to shock and brain trauma, and he derided the theoretical architecture that Moniz had constructed to support the new procedure as "cerebral mythology." At the same meeting the Parisian psychiatrist, Paul Courbon, stated he could not endorse a surgical technique that was solely supported by theoretical considerations rather than clinical observations. He also opined that the mutilation of an organ could not improve its function and that such cerebral wounds as were occasioned by leucotomy risked the later development of meningitis, epilepsy and brain abscesses. Nonetheless, Moniz's reported successful surgical treatment of 14 out of 20 patients led to the rapid adoption of the procedure on an experimental basis by individual clinicians in countries such as Brazil, Cuba, Italy, Romania and the United States during the 1930s.

Italian leucotomy 

Throughout the remainder of the 1930s the number of leucotomies performed in most countries where the technique was adopted remained quite low. In Britain, which was later a major centre for leucotomy, only six operations had been undertaken before 1942. Generally, medical practitioners who attempted the procedure adopted a cautious approach and few patients were leucotomised before the 1940s. Italian neuropsychiatrists, who were typically early and enthusiastic adopters of leucotomy, were exceptional in eschewing such a gradualist course.

Leucotomy was first reported in the Italian medical press in 1936 and Moniz published an article in Italian on the technique in the following year. In 1937, he was invited to Italy to demonstrate the procedure and for a two-week period in June of that year he visited medical centres in Trieste, Ferrara, and one close to Turinthe Racconigi Hospitalwhere he instructed his Italian neuropsychiatric colleagues on leucotomy and also oversaw several operations. Leucotomy was featured at two Italian psychiatric conferences in 1937 and over the next two years a score of medical articles on Moniz's psychosurgery was published by Italian clinicians based in medical institutions located in Racconigi, Trieste, Naples, Genoa, Milan, Pisa, Catania and Rovigo. The major centre for leucotomy in Italy was the Racconigi Hospital, where the experienced neurosurgeon Ludvig Puusepp provided a guiding hand. Under the medical directorship of Emilio Rizzatti, the medical personnel at this hospital had completed at least 200 leucotomies by 1939. Reports from clinicians based at other Italian institutions detailed significantly smaller numbers of leucotomy operations.

Experimental modifications of Moniz's operation were introduced with little delay by Italian medical practitioners. Most notably, in 1937 Amarro Fiamberti, the medical director of a psychiatric institution in Varese, first devised the transorbital procedure whereby the frontal lobes were accessed through the eye sockets. Fiamberti's method was to puncture the thin layer of orbital bone at the top of the socket and then inject alcohol or formalin into the white matter of the frontal lobes through this aperture. Using this method, while sometimes substituting a leucotome for a hypodermic needle, it is estimated that he leucotomised about 100 patients in the period up to the outbreak of World War II. Fiamberti's innovation of Moniz's method would later prove inspirational for Walter Freeman's development of transorbital lobotomy.

American leucotomy

The first prefrontal leucotomy in the United States was performed at the George Washington University Hospital on 14 September 1936 by the neurologist Walter Freeman and his friend and colleague, the neurosurgeon, James W. Watts. Freeman had first encountered Moniz at the London-hosted Second International Congress of Neurology in 1935 where he had presented a poster exhibit of the Portuguese neurologist's work on cerebral angiography. Fortuitously occupying a booth next to Moniz, Freeman, delighted by their chance meeting, formed a highly favourable impression of Moniz, later remarking upon his "sheer genius". According to Freeman, if they had not met in person it is highly unlikely that he would have ventured into the domain of frontal lobe psychosurgery. Freeman's interest in psychiatry was the natural outgrowth of his appointment in 1924 as the medical director of the Research Laboratories of the Government Hospital for the Insane in Washington, known colloquially as St Elizabeth's. Ambitious and a prodigious researcher, Freeman, who favoured an organic model of mental illness causation, spent the next several years exhaustively, yet ultimately fruitlessly, investigating a neuropathological basis for insanity. Chancing upon a preliminary communication by Moniz on leucotomy in the spring of 1936, Freeman initiated a correspondence in May of that year. Writing that he had been considering psychiatric brain surgery previously, he informed Moniz that, "having your authority I expect to go ahead". Moniz, in return, promised to send him a copy of his forthcoming monograph on leucotomy and urged him to purchase a leucotome from a French supplier.

Upon receipt of Moniz's monograph, Freeman reviewed it anonymously for the Archives of Neurology and Psychiatry. Praising the text as one whose "importance can scarcely be overestimated", he summarised Moniz's rationale for the procedure as based on the fact that while no physical abnormality of cerebral cell bodies was observable in the mentally ill, their cellular interconnections may harbour a "fixation of certain patterns of relationship among various groups of cells" and that this resulted in obsessions, delusions and mental morbidity. While recognising that Moniz's thesis was inadequate, for Freeman it had the advantage of circumventing the search for diseased brain tissue in the mentally ill by instead suggesting that the problem was a functional one of the brain's internal wiring where relief might be obtained by severing problematic mental circuits.

In 1937 Freeman and Watts adapted Lima and Moniz's surgical procedure, and created the Freeman-Watts technique, also known as the Freeman-Watts standard prefrontal lobotomy, which they styled the "precision method".

Transorbital lobotomy
The Freeman–Watts prefrontal lobotomy still required drilling holes in the skull, so surgery had to be performed in an operating room by trained neurosurgeons. Walter Freeman believed this surgery would be unavailable to those he saw as needing it most: patients in state mental hospitals that had no operating rooms, surgeons, or anesthesia and limited budgets. Freeman wanted to simplify the procedure so that it could be carried out by psychiatrists in psychiatric hospitals.

Inspired by the work of Italian psychiatrist Amarro Fiamberti, Freeman at some point conceived of approaching the frontal lobes through the eye sockets instead of through drilled holes in the skull. In 1945 he took an icepick from his own kitchen and began testing the idea on grapefruit and cadavers. This new "transorbital" lobotomy involved lifting the upper eyelid and placing the point of a thin surgical instrument (often called an orbitoclast or leucotome, although quite different from the wire loop leucotome described above) under the eyelid and against the top of the eyesocket. A mallet was used to drive the orbitoclast through the thin layer of bone and into the brain along the plane of the bridge of the nose, around 15 degrees toward the interhemispherical fissure. The orbitoclast was malleted 5 centimeters (2 in) into the frontal lobe, and then pivoted 40 degrees at the orbit perforation so the tip cut toward the opposite side of the head (toward the nose). The instrument was returned to the neutral position and sent a further 2 centimeters ( in) into the brain, before being pivoted around 28 degrees each side, to cut outward and again inward. (In a more radical variation at the end of the last cut described, the butt of the orbitoclast was forced upward so the tool cut vertically down the side of the cortex of the interhemispheric fissure; the "Deep Frontal Cut".) All cuts were designed to transect the white fibrous matter connecting the cortical tissue of the prefrontal cortex to the thalamus. The leucotome was then withdrawn and the procedure repeated on the other side.

Freeman performed the first transorbital lobotomy on a live patient in 1946. Its simplicity suggested the possibility of carrying it out in mental hospitals lacking the surgical facilities required for the earlier, more complex procedure. (Freeman suggested that, where conventional anesthesia was unavailable, electroconvulsive therapy be used to render the patient unconscious.) In 1947, the Freeman and Watts partnership ended, as the latter was disgusted by Freeman's modification of the lobotomy from a surgical operation into a simple "office" procedure. Between 1940 and 1944, 684 lobotomies were performed in the United States. However, because of the fervent promotion of the technique by Freeman and Watts, those numbers increased sharply toward the end of the decade. In 1949, the peak year for lobotomies in the US, 5,074 procedures were undertaken, and by 1951 over 18,608 individuals had been lobotomized in the US.

Prevalence 

In the United States, approximately 40,000 people were lobotomized and in England, 17,000 lobotomies were performed. According to one estimate, in the three Nordic countries of Denmark, Norway, and Sweden a combined figure of approximately 9,300 lobotomies were performed. Scandinavian hospitals lobotomized 2.5 times as many people per capita as hospitals in the US. According to another estimate, Sweden lobotomized at least 4,500 people between 1944 and 1966, mainly women. This figure includes young children. And in Norway, there were 2,005 known lobotomies. In Denmark, there were 4,500 known lobotomies. In Japan, the majority of lobotomies were performed on children with behaviour problems. The Soviet Union banned the practice in 1950 on moral grounds. In Germany, it was performed only a few times. By the late 1970s, the practice of lobotomy had generally ceased, although it continued as late as the 1980s in France.

Criticism
As early as 1944, an author in the Journal of Nervous and Mental Disease remarked: "The history of prefrontal lobotomy has been brief and stormy. Its course has been dotted with both violent opposition and with slavish, unquestioning acceptance." Beginning in 1947 Swedish psychiatrist Snorre Wohlfahrt evaluated early trials, reporting that it is "distinctly hazardous to leucotomize schizophrenics" and that lobotomy was "still too imperfect to enable us, with its aid, to venture on a general offensive against chronic cases of mental disorder", stating further that "Psychosurgery has as yet failed to discover its precise indications and contraindications and the methods must unfortunately still be regarded as rather crude and hazardous in many respects." In 1948 Norbert Wiener, the author of Cybernetics: Or the Control and Communication in the Animal and the Machine, said: "[P]refrontal lobotomy ... has recently been having a certain vogue, probably not unconnected with the fact that it makes the custodial care of many patients easier. Let me remark in passing that killing them makes their custodial care still easier."

Concerns about lobotomy steadily grew. Soviet psychiatrist Vasily Gilyarovsky criticized lobotomy and the mechanistic brain localization assumption used to carry out lobotomy:

The Soviet Union officially banned the procedure in 1950 on the initiative of Gilyarovsky. Doctors in the Soviet Union concluded that the procedure was "contrary to the principles of humanity" and through lobotomy' an insane person is changed into an idiot". By the 1970s, numerous countries had banned the procedure, as had several US states.

In 1977, the US Congress, during the presidency of Jimmy Carter, created the National Committee for the Protection of Human Subjects of Biomedical and Behavioral Research to investigate allegations that psychosurgeryincluding lobotomy techniqueswas used to control minorities and restrain individual rights. The committee concluded that some extremely limited and properly performed psychosurgery could have positive effects.

Torsten Wiesel has called the award of the Nobel Prize to Moniz an "astounding [error] of judgment.. a terrible mistake",
and there have been calls for the Nobel Foundation to rescind the award; The Foundation has not done so, and its website still hosts an article defending lobotomy.

Notable cases

 Rosemary Kennedy, sister of US President John F. Kennedy, underwent a lobotomy in 1941 that left her incapacitated and institutionalized for the rest of her life.
 Howard Dully wrote a memoir of his late-life discovery that he had been lobotomized in 1960 at age 12.
 New Zealand author and poet Janet Frame received a literary award in 1951 the day before a scheduled lobotomy was to take place, and it was never performed.
 Josef Hassid, a Polish violinist and composer, was diagnosed with schizophrenia and died at the age of 26 following a lobotomy performed on him in England.
 Swedish modernist painter Sigrid Hjertén died following a lobotomy in 1948.
 American playwright Tennessee Williams' older sister Rose received a lobotomy that left her incapacitated for life; the episode is said to have inspired characters and motifs in some his works.
 It is often said that when an iron rod was accidentally driven through the head of Phineas Gage in 1848, this constituted an "accidental lobotomy", or that this event somehow inspired the development of surgical lobotomy a century later. According to the only book-length study of Gage, careful inquiry turns up no such link.
 In 2011, Daniel Nijensohn, an Argentine-born neurosurgeon at Yale, examined X-rays of Eva Perón and concluded that she underwent a lobotomy for the treatment of pain and anxiety in the last months of her life.
 Carl Panzram, serial killer, claimed that when he was young a lobotomy was performed on him.

Literary and cinematic portrayals

Lobotomies have been featured in several literary and cinematic presentations that both reflected society's attitude toward the procedure and, at times, changed it. Writers and film-makers have played a pivotal role in turning public sentiment against the procedure.

 Robert Penn Warren's 1946 novel All the King's Men describes a lobotomy as making "a Comanche brave look like a tyro with a scalping knife", and portrays the surgeon as a repressed man who cannot change others with love, so he instead resorts to "high-grade carpentry work".

 Tennessee Williams criticized lobotomy in his play Suddenly, Last Summer (1958) because it was sometimes inflicted on homosexualsto render them "morally sane". In the play, a wealthy matriarch offers the local mental hospital a substantial donation if the hospital will give her niece a lobotomy, which she hopes will stop the niece's shocking revelations about the matriarch's son. Warned that a lobotomy might not stop her niece's "babbling", she responds, "That may be, maybe not, but after the operation, who would believe her, Doctor?".

 In Ken Kesey's 1962 novel One Flew Over the Cuckoo's Nest and its 1975 film adaptation, lobotomy is described as "frontal-lobe castration", a form of punishment and control after which "There's nothin' in the face. Just like one of those store dummies." In one patient, "You can see by his eyes how they burned him out over there; his eyes are all smoked up and gray and deserted inside."

 In Sylvia Plath's 1963 novel The Bell Jar, the protagonist reacts with horror to the "perpetual marble calm" of a lobotomized young woman.

 Elliott Baker's 1964 novel and 1966 film version, A Fine Madness, portrays the dehumanizing lobotomy of a womanizing, quarrelsome poet who, afterward, is just as aggressive as ever. The surgeon is depicted as an inhumane crackpot.

 The 1982 biopic film Frances depicts actress Frances Farmer (the subject of the film) undergoing transorbital lobotomy (though the idea that a lobotomy was performed on Farmer, and that Freeman performed it, has been criticized as having little or no factual foundation).

 The 2018 film The Mountain centers on lobotomization, its cultural significance in the context of 1950s America, and mid-century attitudes surrounding mental health in general. The film interrogates the ethical and social implications of the practice through the experiences of its protagonist, a young man whose late mother had been lobotomized. The protagonist takes a job as a medical photographer for the fictional Dr. Wallace Fiennes, portrayed by Jeff Goldblum. Fiennes is loosely based on Freeman.

See also

 Bilateral cingulotomy destruction of a part of the brain
 Bioethics and Medical ethics
 Frontal lobe disorder
 Frontal lobe injury
 Psychosurgery
 History of psychosurgery in the United Kingdom

Notes

Citations

Sources

Print Sources
 
 
 
 
 
 
 
 
 
 
 
 
 
 
 
 
 
 
 
 
 
 
 
 
 
 
 
 
 
 
 
 
 
 
 
 
 
 
  
 
 
 
 
 
 
 
 
 
 
 
 
 
 
 
 
 
 
 
 
 
 
 
 
 
 
 
 
 
 
 
 
 
 
 
 
 
 
 
 
 
 
 
 
 
 
 

Online sources

External links

 My Lobotomy Radio story: Interview with Sallie Ellen Ionesco, lobotomised in 1946
 Mental Cruelty: Sunday Times article on lobotomy and contemporary psychosurgery
 Lobotomy's back: Discover article on cingulotomy
 'My Lobotomy': Howard Dully's Journey. NPR Radio Documentary
 A Qualified Defence of 'Then': QJM
 Ten Notable Lobotomies
 Nobel Panel Urged to Rescind Prize for Lobotomies
 The Lobotomists: BBC Radio 4 documentary on the history of lobotomy

 
Medical controversies
Neurosurgical procedures
Ethically disputed medical practices
Portuguese inventions